C. africanus may refer to:

 Conus africanus, the African cone, a predatory sea snail species 
 Canis africanus, a synonym for Xenocyon lycaonoides, an extinct mammal species
 Chamaeleo africanus, the African chameleon

See also
 Africanus (disambiguation)